Horne may refer to:

Places
Horn (Netherlands), the village of Horn or Horne in the Netherlands
Horne (Denmark), a village near Hirtshals in Hjørring Kommune, Denmark
County of Horne, historic county from the Holy Roman Empire, located in what today is Netherlands and Belgium
Horne, Surrey, England, United Kingdom

Other uses
Horne (surname)
Horne, a Moogle from Final Fantasy XII

See also
Joseph Horne Company, a chain of Pittsburgh, Pennsylvania, United States-based department stores
Horn (disambiguation)
Van Horne (disambiguation)